This is a list of Italian football transfers, for the 2008–09 season , from and to Serie A and Serie B.

Summer transfer window (August)

Summer transfer window (date unknown)

Out of window transfer

References

Italian
Trans
2008